The only two-game total point series in Grey Cup history was played between the Ottawa Rough Riders and the Toronto Balmy Beach Beachers. It was Ottawa's first Grey Cup championship since the Senators won back-to-back titles in 1925 and 1926. It was Balmy Beach's fourth and final appearance at a Grey Cup, winning two times in four opportunities.

The Canadian Rugby Union arranged the series after it refused to allow the WIFU winners, the Winnipeg Blue Bombers to compete in the final. The reason for the refusal was based on the WIFU season being played under rules that varied from IRFU rules.

Regular season

Final regular season standings
Note: GP = Games Played, W = Wins, L = Losses, T = Ties, PF = Points For, PA = Points Against, Pts = Points
*Bold text means that they have clinched the playoffs

A tie game between the Hamilton Alerts and Camp Borden was ordered to be replayed but was cancelled.

Grey Cup playoffs
Note: All dates in 1940

Division finals

Winnipeg won the total-point series by 30–2. Winnipeg would have advanced to the Grey Cup game, but were refused by the Canadian Rugby Union. They instead went to the United States at the beginning of the 1941 season to play the Columbus Bullies, the champions of the American Football League, in a three-game series. The Bullies defeated the Blue Bombers 2 games to 1, with scores of 12–19, 6–0, and 31–1.

Toronto Balmy Beach won the total-point series by 36–0.

Ottawa won the total-point series by 20–2. Ottawa will play Toronto Balmy Beach (ORFU Champions) in the Grey Cup game.

Grey Cup Championship

1940 Interprovincial Rugby Football Union All-Stars
NOTE: During this time most players played both ways, so the All-Star selections do not distinguish between some offensive and defensive positions.
QB – Bobby Coulter, Toronto Argonauts
FW – Andy Tommy, Ottawa Rough Riders
HB – Tony Golab, Ottawa Rough Riders
HB – Gordon Noseworthy, Montreal Bulldogs
HB – Sammy Sward, Ottawa Rough Riders
E  – Eddie Burton, Montreal Bulldogs
E  – Bernie Thornton, Toronto Argonauts
C  – Doug Turner, Hamilton Tigers
G – George Fraser, Ottawa Rough Riders
G – Len Staughton, Ottawa Rough Riders
T – Bunny Wadsworth, Ottawa Rough Riders
T – Dave Sprague, Ottawa Rough Riders

1940 Western Interprovincial Football Union All-Stars
NOTE: During this time most players played both ways, so the All-Star selections do not distinguish between some offensive and defensive positions.
QB – Greg Kabat, Winnipeg Blue Bombers
FW – Jeff Nicklin, Winnipeg Blue Bombers
HB – Fritz Hanson, Winnipeg Blue Bombers
HB – Art Stevenson, Winnipeg Blue Bombers
FB – Raul Rowe, Calgary Bronks
E  – Larry Haynes, Calgary Bronks
E  – Ches McCance, Winnipeg Blue Bombers
E  – Bud Marquardt, Winnipeg Blue Bombers
C  – Dean Griffing, Regina Roughriders
G – Maurice Williams, Regina Roughriders
G – Bill Ceretti, Winnipeg Blue Bombers
T – Gord Gellhaye, Calgary Bronks
T – Toar Springstein, Regina Roughriders

1940 Ontario Rugby Football Union All-Stars
NOTE: During this time most players played both ways, so the All-Star selections do not distinguish between some offensive and defensive positions.
QB – Bobby Porter, Toronto Balmy Beach Beachers
FW – Ralph Perry, Sarnia Imperials
HB – Don Crowe, Toronto Balmy Beach Beachers
HB – Eddie Thompson, Camp Borden
DB – Frank Seymour, Toronto Balmy Beach Beachers
E  – Jim Butler, Sarnia 2/26 Battery
E  – Syd Reynolds, Toronto Balmy Beach Beachers
C  – Nick Paithouski, Sarnia 2/26 Battery
G – Bob Reid, Toronto Balmy Beach Beachers
G – Bruce Barron, Toronto Balmy Beach Beachers
T – Gord Shields, Toronto Balmy Beach Beachers
T – Dick Norris, Sarnia 2/26 Battery

1940 Canadian Football Awards
 Jeff Russel Memorial Trophy (IRFU MVP) – Andy Tommy (FW), Ottawa Rough Riders
 Imperial Oil Trophy (ORFU MVP) - Nick Paithouski - Sarnia 2/26 Battery

References

 
Canadian Football League seasons
Grey Cups hosted in Toronto
Grey Cups hosted in Ottawa